Siras Pur village is a census town in North West district in the Indian state of Delhi.

Demographics
At the 2001 India census, Siras Pur had a population of 14,558. Males constituted 56% of the population and females 44%. It had an average literacy rate of 65%, higher than the national average of 59.5%, with male literacy at 73% and female literacy at 55%. 17% of the population was under 6 years of age.

References

Cities and towns in North West Delhi district